In typography, a star is any of several glyphs with a number of points arrayed within an imaginary circle.

Four points

Five points

See also
 Mullet (heraldry)
 Pentagram

Six points

See also
 Seal of Solomon
 Hexagram

Seven points 
Commonwealth Star
Heptagram

Eight points

Nine points

See also
Enneagram

Ten points
Decagram

Eleven points

Hendecagram

Twelve points

See also
Blue Sky with a White Sun
Dodecagram

Thirteen points
Tridecagram

Fourteen points
Tetradecagram

Fifteen points
Pentadecagram

Sixteen points

See also
Hexadecagram

Multiple stars

Notes

References

See also
 Asterisk
 Asterism (typography)
 Unicode symbols
 Solar symbols#Modern pictogram
 Star polygon
 Polygons
 X

Star symbols
Typographical symbols